The Lewis House is a historic house located at 210 East Alabama Avenue in Ruston, Louisiana. It now hosts the Lewis House Victorian Bed & Breakfast, Gift Shoppe, and Tea Room.

Built in 1902 for W.J. Lewis, the building is a two-story frame house in a mixed Queen Anne Revival-Colonial Revival style. The house was home to Lewis family until 1987, when it was purchased and restored by Colvin family. It was subsequently used as an antique shop.

The house was listed on the National Register of Historic Places on October 20, 1988.

See also
 National Register of Historic Places listings in Lincoln Parish, Louisiana

References

External links
 The Lewis House Victorian Bed & Breakfast, Gift Shoppe, and Tea Room website

Houses on the National Register of Historic Places in Louisiana
Houses completed in 1902
Colonial Revival architecture in Louisiana
Queen Anne architecture in Louisiana
Lincoln Parish, Louisiana
National Register of Historic Places in Lincoln Parish, Louisiana